The following species in the flowering plant genus Smilax, the greenbriers, are accepted by Plants of the World Online. Because members of Smilax have wide morphological variation and are dioecious, it is a taxonomically difficult genus.

Smilax aberrans 
Smilax aculeatissima 
Smilax amamiana 
Smilax amblyobasis 
Smilax ampla 
Smilax anceps 
Smilax anguina 
Smilax annulata 
Smilax aquifolium 
Smilax arisanensis 
Smilax aristolochiifolia 
Smilax aspera 
Smilax aspericaulis 
Smilax assumptionis 
Smilax astrosperma 
Smilax auriculata 
Smilax australis 
Smilax austrozhejiangensis 
Smilax azorica 
Smilax bapouensis 
Smilax basilata 
Smilax bauhinioides 
Smilax bella 
Smilax biflora 
Smilax biltmoreana 
Smilax binchuanensis 
Smilax biumbellata 
Smilax blumei 
Smilax bockii 
Smilax bona-nox 
Smilax borneensis 
Smilax bracteata 
Smilax brasiliensis 
Smilax californica 
Smilax calophylla 
Smilax cambodiana 
Smilax campestris 
Smilax canariensis 
Smilax canellifolia 
Smilax celebica 
Smilax chapaensis 
Smilax china 
Smilax chinensis 
Smilax chingii 
Smilax cinnamomea 
Smilax cissoides 
Smilax cocculoides 
Smilax cognata 
Smilax compta 
Smilax corbularia 
Smilax cordato-ovata 
Smilax cordifolia 
Smilax coriacea 
Smilax cristalensis 
Smilax cuprea 
Smilax cuspidata 
Smilax darrisii 
Smilax davidiana 
Smilax densibarbata 
Smilax discotis 
Smilax domingensis 
Smilax ecirrhata 
Smilax elastica 
Smilax elegans 
Smilax elegantissima 
Smilax elmeri 
Smilax elongatoumbellata 
Smilax emeiensis 
Smilax erecta 
Smilax excelsa 
Smilax extensa 
Smilax ferox 
Smilax flavicaulis 
Smilax fluminensis 
Smilax fooningensis 
Smilax fortunensis 
Smilax fui 
Smilax gagnepainii 
Smilax gaudichaudiana 
Smilax gigantea 
Smilax gigantocarpa 
Smilax glabra 
Smilax glauca 
Smilax glaucochina 
Smilax glyciphylla 
Smilax goyazana 
Smilax gracilior 
Smilax griffithii 
Smilax guianensis 
Smilax guiyangensis 
Smilax havanensis 
Smilax hayatae 
Smilax hemsleyana 
Smilax herbacea 
Smilax hilariana 
Smilax hirtellicaulis 
Smilax horridiramula 
Smilax hugeri 
Smilax hypoglauca 
Smilax ilicifolia 
Smilax illinoensis 
Smilax indosinica 
Smilax inversa 
Smilax irrorata 
Smilax jamesii 
Smilax japicanga 
Smilax javensis 
Smilax kaniensis 
Smilax keyensis 
Smilax kingii 
Smilax klotzschii 
Smilax korthalsii 
Smilax kwangsiensis 
Smilax laevis 
Smilax lanceifolia 
Smilax lappacea 
Smilax larvata 
Smilax lasioneura 
Smilax laurifolia 
Smilax lebrunii 
Smilax leucophylla 
Smilax ligneoriparia 
Smilax ligustrifolia 
Smilax loheri 
Smilax longiflora 
Smilax longifolia 
Smilax lucida 
Smilax luei 
Smilax lunglingensis 
Smilax lushuiensis 
Smilax lutescens 
Smilax luzonensis 
Smilax macrocarpa 
Smilax magnifolia 
Smilax mairei 
Smilax malipoensis 
Smilax maritima 
Smilax maypurensis 
Smilax megacarpa 
Smilax megalantha 
Smilax melanocarpa 
Smilax melastomifolia 
Smilax menispermoidea 
Smilax micrandra 
Smilax micrantha 
Smilax microdontus 
Smilax microphylla 
Smilax minarum 
Smilax minutiflora 
Smilax modesta 
Smilax mollis 
Smilax moranensis 
Smilax munita 
Smilax muscosa 
Smilax myosotiflora 
Smilax myrtillus 
Smilax nageliana 
Smilax nana 
Smilax nantoensis 
Smilax neocaledonica 
Smilax neocyclophylla 
Smilax nervomarginata 
Smilax nigrescens 
Smilax nipponica 
Smilax nova-guineensis 
Smilax obliquata 
Smilax oblongata 
Smilax oblongifolia 
Smilax ocreata 
Smilax odoratissima 
Smilax officinalis 
Smilax orbiculata 
Smilax ornata 
Smilax orthoptera 
Smilax outanscianensis 
Smilax ovalifolia 
Smilax ovatolanceolata 
Smilax pachysandroides 
Smilax paniculata 
Smilax papuana 
Smilax perfoliata 
Smilax pertenuis 
Smilax petelotii 
Smilax pilcomayensis 
Smilax pilosa 
Smilax pinfaensis 
Smilax plurifurcata 
Smilax poilanei 
Smilax polyacantha 
Smilax polyandra 
Smilax polyantha 
Smilax polycolea 
Smilax populnea 
Smilax pottingeri 
Smilax prolifera 
Smilax pseudochina 
Smilax pulverulenta 
Smilax pumila 
Smilax purhampuy 
Smilax purpurata 
Smilax pygmaea 
Smilax quadrata 
Smilax quadrumbellata 
Smilax quinquenervia 
Smilax remotinervis 
Smilax retroflexa 
Smilax riparia 
Smilax rotundifolia 
Smilax roxburghiana 
Smilax rubromarginata 
Smilax rufescens 
Smilax sailenii 
Smilax salicifolia 
Smilax sanguinea 
Smilax santaremensis 
Smilax saulensis 
Smilax schomburgkiana 
Smilax scobinicaulis 
Smilax sebeana 
Smilax seisuiensis 
Smilax septemnervia 
Smilax setiramula 
Smilax setosa 
Smilax sieboldii 
Smilax silverstonei 
Smilax sinclairii 
Smilax siphilitica 
Smilax solanifolia 
Smilax spicata 
Smilax spinosa 
Smilax spissa 
Smilax spruceana 
Smilax stans 
Smilax stenophylla 
Smilax subinermis 
Smilax subpubescens 
Smilax subsessiliflora 
Smilax sumatrensis 
Smilax synandra 
Smilax talbotiana 
Smilax tamnoides 
Smilax tetraptera 
Smilax timorensis 
Smilax tomentosa 
Smilax trachypoda 
Smilax trinervula 
Smilax tsinchengshanensis 
Smilax tuberculata 
Smilax turbans 
Smilax utilis 
Smilax vaginata 
Smilax vanchingshanensis 
Smilax velutina 
Smilax verrucosa 
Smilax verticalis 
Smilax vitiensis 
Smilax wallichii 
Smilax walteri 
Smilax wightii 
Smilax williamsii 
Smilax yunnanensis 
Smilax zeylanica

References

Smilacaceae
Smilax